NBA 2K2 is a 2001 sports video game developed by Visual Concepts and published by Sega for Dreamcast, PlayStation 2, Xbox and GameCube. NBA 2K2 featured more street courts such as Mosswood, Fonde Rec Center, Venice Beach, etc. The cover athlete is Allen Iverson of the Philadelphia 76ers.

It is also one of the few games to cross all the 6th generation platforms, alongside Puyo Pop Fever and Capcom vs. SNK 2.

Overview
NBA 2K2 now offers a number of new features designed to improve upon Sega Sports' basketball franchise, which began on the Dreamcast in 1999. In addition to the NBA teams, players, and stadiums from the 2001–02 season, the game includes five legends teams starring legends such as Michael Jordan, Larry Bird, Julius Erving, Wilt Chamberlain, Magic Johnson, and Bill Russell.

Each player's abilities reflect those based on the 2001–02 season, so the location of shots is important depending on the athlete. Moves such as crossover dribbles, pump fakes, speed bursts, and both icon and directional passing allow players multiple options to move the ball down the court. While approaching the net, players can press a single button to pass to the man closest to the basket or use their athlete's size advantage to back down a defender. Players can also call for a pick with a press of the button, pass out of a shot, or select one of four in-game offensive plays from a roster of 16.

Defensive moves include steals, a combination block and jump button, as well as the ability to face up a ball handler, double-team a star player, commit an intentional foul, and call one of seven defensive sets such as Man-to-Man or Half-Court Trap. Before playing a game, adjustments can be made for game speed, quarter length, and difficulty. In-game features include instant replay and a choice of five different camera angles. User statistics as well as season and franchise progress can be saved after each game.

Features
Modes of play include Exhibition, an adjustable Season (from 14 to 82 games), Practice, Tourney, Playoffs, Fantasy, where players can create a custom tournament or league after drafting, and Franchise, which involves signing free agents, cutting players, making trades, and scouting for new talent before embarking on consecutive seasons. Players can also edit or create a team using ten custom logos as well as design their own star athlete from scratch.

Development
More than 30 people worked on the game.

Reception

The game received "universal acclaim" on all platforms except the PlayStation 2 version, which received "generally favorable reviews", according to video game review aggregator Metacritic. GameSpot named it 2001's best traditional sports game released for game consoles. It was a runner-up for the publication's "Best Dreamcast Game" award, but lost to Phantasy Star Online.

References

External links
 

2001 video games
Dreamcast games
GameCube games
Multiplayer and single-player video games
2
PlayStation 2 games
Sega video games
Video games developed in the United States
Video games set in 2001
Video games set in 2002
Xbox games